Scipione Bozzuti (died 1591) was a Roman Catholic prelate who served as Bishop of Lucera (1582–1591)
and Bishop of Calvi Risorta (1580–1582).

Biography
On 24 February 1580, during the papacy of Pope Gregory XIII, Bozzuti was appointed as Bishop of Calvi Risorta.
On 14 February 1582, he was appointed Bishop of Lucera.
He served as Bishop of Lucera until his death in 1591.

References

External links and additional sources
 (for Chronology of Bishops) 
 (for Chronology of Bishops) 
 (for Chronology of Bishops)  
 (for Chronology of Bishops)  

16th-century Italian Roman Catholic bishops
Bishops appointed by Pope Gregory XIII
1591 deaths